Reynaldo A. Duque (29 October 1945 – 8 April 2013) was a multilingual Ilocano writer (he wrote in Ilocano, Filipino, and English) who was the editor-in-chief of Liwayway magazine, the leading Filipino (Tagalog) weekly magazine in the Philippines. He was a fictionist, novelist, poet, playwright, radio/TV/movie scriptwriter, editor, and translator.

A multi-awarded author, among his numerous literary decorations is the Palanca Hall of Fame Award bestowed on him in 2003 for having won five first prizes in the prestigious Palanca Awards. He was also first prize winner in Filipino Epic in the 1998 Centennial Literary Awards sponsored by the Philippine Government.

He was a native of Bagani Ubbog, Candon, Ilocos Sur.

Awards
 Cultural Center of the Philippines (CCP) Writing Grants 
 Palanca Awards
 Talaang Ginto-Gantimpalang Collantes
 Centennial Literary Awards
 Pedro Bucaneg Award
 Gov. Roque Ablan Awards for Iloko Literature (GRAAFIL)

References

1945 births
2013 deaths
Filipino writers
Ilocano-language writers
People from Ilocos Sur
Place of death missing
Palanca Award recipients
Tagalog-language writers
Ilocano people